Brian Ramsay (born February 24, 1980) is a former Canadian football offensive lineman and currently serving as the Canadian Football League Players' Association's Executive Director. He was drafted in the fifth round of the 2006 CFL Draft by the Toronto Argonauts. He played college football at New Mexico. He transitioned into the role in April 2016 after completing a CFL playing career spanning from 2006-2015. Ramsay has played a pivotal role in the negotiations and ratification of the 2019 and 2022 collective agreements between the CFL players and the leagues' ownership.

Career

CFLPA 
As CFLPA Executive Director, Ramsay has overseen a transition throughout the Association, including leading the players through collective bargaining in 2019, the global pandemic COVID19 during 2020/21 and again through bargaining the 2022 collective agreement. Mandated by the membership upon being hired, Ramsay developed strategic planning that focused on the Associations' communications, internal operating structures and processes that benefit the CFLPA membership both on and off the field.

From an operations standpoint, Ramsay restructured the Association by engaging Art Vertlieb QC as CFLPA general counsel and hiring Ken Georgetti, former president of the 3.2 million-member Canadian Labour Congress, as Senior Advisor to the Association. Other notable additions to the Association were; former president of the Orthopedics Association of Canada, Dr. Bas Masri, as the first CFLPA Medical Director, and world-renowned professor of neurosurgery, Dr. Chris Honey, as the CFLPA's Director of Neurology. Dr. Honey was instrumental in recruiting a network of neurology specialists across Canada for membership consultation upon request. Bolstering the presence and branding of CFL players was also done with critical additions to the licensing and sponsorship, and communications departments of the Association. In 2019, a strategic alliance with the 800,000 member strong United Steelworkers Union was formed, resulting in a mutually beneficial relationship for both unions' membership today and into the future.

2019 Collective Bargaining 
During the 2019 collective bargaining, directives reflected steadfast confidence from the membership in a strong strike mandate and just as impressive support from players upon ratifying the contract. Health and safety initiatives have been a focal point of Ramsay in his tenure to date. The tripling of rehabilitation coverage for injuries sustained on-field was crucial in the 2019 negotiations with the CFL. The talks saw a focus on player rehabilitation and safety with additions to equipment standards, an expanded Health and Safety Committee, and restrictions for training camps and in-season practice schedules.

2022 Collective Bargaining 
After navigating amendments to the CFL players' agreement for the 2020 and 2021 seasons, Ramsay again chaired the bargaining committee that negotiated a new seven-year collective agreement in May 2022. After talks broke down upon the expiry of the existing contract on May 14, 2022, Ramsay helped lead the CFLPA through its first work stoppage in 48 years. The resolve of the membership proved to be impactful as historical gains were seen, including increased player safety and rehabilitation, revenue sharing, and forms of guaranteed contracts. Also of note was the development of a mental health and substance abuse program, multiple increases to the minimum player salary, and a change that see's the agreement expiring one month before the 2028 training camp period.

Workers' Compensation 
Ramsay has been a strong advocate for player health and safety and legislative changes to be made provincially to workers' compensation regulations across Canada. In 2016, under Ramsay's leadership, a coalition was formed with professional sports associations         (NHLPA, PHPA, NLLPA, among others) across Canada to address these inequalities. In the spring of 2022, WorkSafeBC has now formally appointed this initiative to the 2022-2024 workplan to review the exclusion of professional athletes in Canada.

CFLPA Academy 
Understanding the transition many athletes face during the transition from sport, in August 2016, under Ramsay's leadership, the Association created the CFLPA Academy as a resource for members to prepare for life outside of football. The program now boasts over 65% enrollment by active members within the union and over 1800 individual historical users. Pillars of the Academy include; education (Oregon State, Athabasca University, Saskatchewan Polytechnic), career counselling, transition opportunities, and health & wellness. The program consists of scholarships, internships, one-on-one coaching, financial literacy, and wellness platforms for all CFLPA members at no cost and has now be opened to spouses and dependent's of the CFLPA membership. Since the inception of the Academy, the Association has seen members train to become firefighters, and airline pilots, start undergraduate degrees and finish graduate degrees while playing in the CFL and transitioning from professional sports.

CFL 
Drafted in the fifth round of the 2006 CFL Draft by the Toronto Argonauts. Ramsay played offensive line in 152 CFL games over a nine-year career with the Toronto Argonauts, Hamilton Tiger-Cats, and Edmonton Elks.

KPMG 
Ramsay articled and worked for the big four accounting firm KPMG for just under a decade as an auditor focusing on not-for-profit and government entities.

Education 
Ramsay received his B.A from the University of New Mexico and obtained his Masters of Business Administration from Royal Roads University.

References

External links
Edmonton Eskimos bio 
Toronto Argonauts bio

 CFL Players' Association Announces New Executive Team. Retrieved January 12, 2017
 CFL Players' Association Announces New Executive Team. Retrieved March 6, 2018
 CFL Players' Association Announces New Executive Team. Retrieved March 1, 2020 
 CFL Players' Association Announces New Executive Team. Retrieved March 8, 2022 
 Barnes, D (2022, May 12) Still no deal after full day of talks between Canadian Football and players. Retrieved May 15, 2022, from https://torontosun.com/sports/still-no-deal-after-full-day-of-talks-between-canadian-football-league-and-players
 Ralph, D (2022, May 10) CFL to table new contract offer to players association, sources say. Retrieved May 12, 2022, from https://globalnews.ca/news/8824436/cfl-to-table-new-contract-offer-players-association-on-wednesday/
 Larson, S. (2018, December 14). Football players association pushes province to allow access to workers' compensation for athletes | CBC News. Retrieved January 16, 2019, from https://www.cbc.ca/news/canada/saskatoon/football-players-workers-compensation-1.4945469
 Woods, J. (2018, March 21). CFLPA files grievance against CFL over player safety and rehabilitation. Retrieved May 18, 2018, from https://www.theglobeandmail.com/sports/football/cflpa-files-grievance-against-cfl-over-player-safety-and-rehabilitation/article38313590/
 Press, T. (2020, May 21). Brian Ramsay says CFLPA's focus is exhausting all options for safe 2020 CFL campaign. Retrieved June 8, 2020, from https://www.tsn.ca/ramsay-says-cflpa-s-focus-is-exhausting-all-options-for-safe-2020-cfl-campaign-1.1477983
 Ralph, D. (2020, May 12). COVID-19 pandemic creating twice as many challenges for some CFL players | CBC Sports. Retrieved July 4, 2020, from https://www.cbc.ca/sports/football/cfl/cfl-coronavirus-players-unemployed-cflpa-brian-ramsay-1.5566320

1980 births
Living people
Players of Canadian football from British Columbia
Sportspeople from Victoria, British Columbia
New Mexico Lobos football players
Butte College alumni
Royal Roads University alumni
Toronto Argonauts players
Hamilton Tiger-Cats players
Edmonton Elks players